Reflets d'Allemagne, Op. 28, is a cycle of eight piano pieces by Florent Schmitt. The original work exists in two versions: for piano 4-hands, and piano solo. Published in 1905, these waltzes were initially orchestrated for the concert and then incorporated into the music for a ballet given in 1932 at the Opéra-Comique. (Koblenz and Nuremberg)

Structure 
 Heidelberg
 Coblentz
 Lübeck
 Werder
 Vienna
 Dresden
 Nuremberg
 Munich

Source 
 François-René Tranchefort,  éd.Fayard 1990,

References

External links 
 Reflets d'Allemagne on BnF

Compositions by Florent Schmitt
Compositions for solo piano
Compositions for piano four-hands
1905 compositions
Suites (music)
Orchestral suites